This is a list of stratigraphic units dinosaur trace fossils have been recovered from. Although Dinosauria is a clade which includes the descendant taxon Aves (modern birds), this article covers only stratigraphic units containing Mesozoic forms. Units listed are all either formation rank or higher (e.g. group).

Coprolites

Eggs or nests

Tracks

See also

List of dinosaur-bearing rock formations

Sources
 Weishampel, David B.; Dodson, Peter; and Osmólska, Halszka (eds.): The Dinosauria, 2nd, Berkeley: University of California Press. 861 pp; .

References

Trace fossils
Dinosaur trace fossils